Susan Mascarin Keane, born Susan Mascarin (born June 28, 1964) is a retired tennis player from the U.S. Her best singles result in a Grand Slam was the 1984 US Open, where she advanced to the fourth round.

Born in Grosse Pointe Shores, Michigan, Mascarin was the US Open Girls' Singles champion in 1980.

WTA Tour finals

Singles 1

Doubles 2 (1-1)

External links 
 
 

1964 births
Living people
People from Grosse Pointe Shores, Michigan
Sportspeople from Metro Detroit
American female tennis players
Tennis people from Michigan
US Open (tennis) junior champions
Grand Slam (tennis) champions in girls' singles
21st-century American women